The Yucatán Platform or Yucatán Shelf is a geologic or physiographic province, and a continental and carbonate platform, in the Maya Block of the southernmost portion of the North American Plate. It comprises the Yucatán Peninsula and its continental shelf, located between the Gulf of Mexico and the Caribbean Sea.

Extent 
The Yucatán Platform is commonly defined as the continental platform constituted by the Yucatán Peninsula and its continental shelf. As such, the margins of the continental shelf, or, more particularly, their  isobaths or depth contours, are often taken as the platform's submarine limits. Its subaerial limits (on the Yucatán Peninsula) are less precisely fixed.

The US Geological Survey have demarcated the limits of the Yucatán Platform. Their British, Belizean, and Mexican counterparts have not defined an equivalent geologic, physiographic, or geomorphic province or region.

Geography

Political 
The exposed or peninsular portion of the Yucatán Platform encompasses four districts of Belize (i.e., Corozal, Orange Walk, Belize, and Cayo), one department of Guatemala (i.e., Peten), and four states of Mexico (i.e., Quintana Roo, Yucatán, Campeche, and Tabasco). Its submarine portion encompasses the continental shelf which abuts those of the aforementioned districts with a coast.

Basins 
At least three sedimentary basins have been identified in the Yucatán Platform, namely, the Campeche, Yucatán, and PetenCorozal.

Faults 
At least six fault systems or zones have been identified in the Yucatán Platform, namely, the Holbox, Hondo, Ticul, Ring of Cenotes, ChemaxCatoche, and La Libertad, with the first four of these considered prominent.

Geology

Formation 
The Gulf of Mexico formed during a 7090 million year rifting of Pangaea, which began some 240 million years ago, during the Middle Triassic, and ended some 170150 million years ago, during the Middle or Late Jurassic. The subaerially exposed (i.e., peninsular) portion of the platform is thought to have been fully submarine up to some 3010 million years ago.

Layers

Basement 
The platform's crystalline basement is composed mainly of Precambrian to Palaeozoic granodiorite rocks.

Cover 
The platform's sedimentary cover is composed mainly of carbonates and evaporites formed during or after the Early Cretaceous.

Notes

Citations

References 

 
 
 
 
 
 
 
 
 
 
 
 
 
 
 
 
 
 
 
 
 

Geology of North America
Geology of the Atlantic Ocean
Geology of Belize
Geology of Guatemala
Geology of Mexico
Geomorphology#Physiographic divisions
Physiographic divisions